The Hawaiian hoary bat (Lasiurus semotus), also known as ōpeapea, is a species of bat endemic to the islands of Hawaii. Whereas the mainland hoary bat (L. cinereus) is found throughout North America, the Hawaiian hoary bat is distributed only among the major volcanic islands of Hawaii, making it the only extant and native terrestrial mammal in the state; although some studies also posit that the mainland hoary bat lives in sympatry on the Hawaiian Islands alongside the Hawaiian hoary bat, this has been disputed. The Hawaiian hoary bat was officially named the state land mammal of Hawaii in 2015. It is a federally listed endangered taxon of the United States.

Like many species of bats, Hawaiian hoary bats are brown in color. However they are distinguished by the silver coloration that ‘frosts’ the fur on their back, ears, and neck. They typically weigh between 14 to 18 g (0.49 to 0.63 ounces), and have a wingspan of about 10.5 to 13.5 inches, with females being larger than males. They are insectivorous, nocturnal, and forage and hunt using echolocation. They are a solitary subspecies and roost individually rather than in colonies. They are found throughout a large range of different habitats - forests, agricultural fields, and areas populated with humans. Due to their elusive and solitary nature, there is very limited knowledge on the ecology or life history of the bat. As of now, population sizes are unknown, which is problematic because this data is necessary for species recovery plans. Currently the Hawaiian hoary bat is listed as endangered under the Endangered Species Act.

Regarding conservation, the Hawaiian hoary bat faces a number of possible threats including: habitat loss, collisions with man-made structures such as wind turbines and barbed wire, impact of pesticides on primary food source, predation and competition with invasive species, and roost disturbance and tree cover reduction.

Taxonomy 
Prior to 2015, the Hawaiian hoary bat was considered an isolated subspecies of the mainland hoary bat. However, a 2015 study recovered deep phylogenetic divergence between both species dating back to the mid-Pleistocene, about 1.4 million years ago, and thus split them as distinct species. However, the study also found evidence for two different colonizations of Hawaii by hoary bats; one during the Pleistocene by the ancestors of the Hawaiian hoary bat, but also a much more recent colonization event by the mainland hoary bat, and thus posited that the islands were inhabited by both species, living in cryptic sympatry with one another. A 2017 study further affirmed these findings. However, a 2020 genetic study of a much wider sample of Hawaiian Lasiurus supported the deep divergence between the Hawaiian and mainland hoary bats, but found no evidence that both species were sympatric on Hawaii, and attributed the previous studies' findings to incomplete lineage sorting. This would indicate that L. semotus is indeed the only bat, and overall the only native land mammal, found on Hawaii.

Description 

The common name of the hoary bat was inspired by the hoary, or frosty, coloration of its coat. The Hawaiian hoary bat is distinguished by a silver tint along the brown fur of its back. More pronounced silver bands are found along the neck as the fur transitions to a yellowish brown along the face with the ears retaining a black edging around their perimeter. There is a gender discrepancy in terms of size as females will typically be larger than males. The Hawaiian name, ōpeapea ("half-leaf", also the shape of a traditional Hawaiian sail), refers to the outline of the bat's body, which is shaped like half a taro leaf.

Ecology and behavior

Diet 
The Hawaiian hoary bat is a generalist insectivore. An insectivore is a species that preys on insects for its source of food. A generalist is a species that preys on a wide variety of, in this case, insects. The bat’s main source of food consists of moths (Lepidoptera) and beetles (Coleoptera), but also includes crickets, mosquitoes, termites, and many other insects. The bat’s preference toward moths causes them to be attracted to light, which results in bat environments encroaching into towns. A high proportion of bats can also be found feeding in pastures, where beetles are abundant due to the high amounts of dung excreted by cattle. Since these bats are generalist hunters, they have been known to prey on both native and invasive insect species. This protects crops from pest infestations.

The diet of the Hawaiian hoary bat can fluctuate depending on its environment. The bats mainly forage for food on the edges of clustered forests, in open pastures, or above the canopy. Within open environments, moths consist of a high majority of their diet. In cluttered environments, the diet is distributed more evenly across multiple insect species.

Surveys indicate that the bat is opportunistic and can forage over many habitat types, including native and non-native vegetation and the open ocean.

The Hawaiian hoary bat is a nocturnal hunter, usually hunting for food just before sunset and returning to its nest just before sunrise. Like other bats, they capture and eat their prey while still in flight. Bats do not have keen eyesight to spot their prey; rather, they use echolocation. By foraging using echolocation, the bats can catch their target while in flight. The bats’ flight patterns differ in accordance to the environment they are hunting in and the prey they are hunting. When hunting in open environments (i.e pastures or above the canopy) where larger prey is more abundant, they will fly faster with less maneuverability. When hunting in closed environments (i.e clustered forests) where smaller prey is more abundant, they will fly slower to allow for more maneuverability to catch their elusive prey. While foraging, bats can travel up to 12 miles in a night.

The foraging activity of the Hawaiian hoary bat is most frequent on the islands of Hawaii, with additional activity on Kauai, Oahu, and Maui. No foraging activity is found on Molokai.

Reproduction 
The Hawaiian hoary bat follows a seasonal reproductive cycle. The pre-pregnancy months consist of November to April, after which breeding with a single mate occurs. The bats do not mate for life and will have a new mate each season. The pregnancy period begins in May and ends in June, when the lactation period begins. Fledglings are born at the end of August and will remain in the mother’s roosting nest until they become independent in 6 to 7 weeks. Mothers usually give birth to twins. This seasonal reproductive cycle causes a change in the habitat distribution of the bats. From pregnancy until fledgling birth, the bats will remain in lowland environments. As the mating season (and winter months) approaches, bats will move to highland environments. Changes in the habitat distribution of bats are linked to the energy abundance within an environment, influenced by temperature, rainfall, and food availability. While the bats are located on all the Hawaiian Islands, no breeding was observed on Niihau and Kahoolawe.

Unlike some bats, the Hawaiian hoary bat is a solitary species meaning that it roosts individually rather than in a colony. The bats will remember their roosts and foraging locations and return to them repeatedly. The bats prefer to roost in forest vegetation less than 4.5 meters (15 feet) tall (Hawaiian hoary bat Guidance for Renewable Wind Energy Proponents). These bats are usually find roosting in a multitude of plants consisting of: Metrosideros polymorpha (most common Hawaiian tree), coconut palms (Cocos nucifera), kukui (Aleurites moluccana), kiawe (Prosopis pallida), avocado trees (Persea americana), shower trees (Cassia javanica), pukiawe (Styphelia tameiameiae), fern clumps, Eucalyptus, and Sugi pine (Cryptomeria japonica).

Habitat distribution 

The habitat distribution of the Hawaiian hoary bat is observed by detecting the frequency of the bat’s echolocation using acoustic detectors, as well as through bat netting and insect collection (to track foraging data). The Hawaiian hoary bat is located on all the Hawaiian Islands, but does not breed on Niihau and Kahoolawe. The habitat of the bat encompasses a wide range of altitudes and location types. This habitat ranges from sea level all the way to 2,288 meters (or 7,500 feet). The bats are found in landscapes including human populated areas, forests, agricultural fields, pastures, and even near mountain summits (almost 4,000 meters or 13,000 feet). During the warmer months, bats will travel to lowland environments where they will be more active. During the colder months, the bats will travel to highland environments where they will not be as active.

Life history 
Due to their elusive and solitary nature, there is little research on the life history of the Hawaiian hoary bat. In 2005 it was estimated that population size ranged from a few hundred to a few thousand bats, but this was based on incomplete and inadequate data. As of January 2020, population sizes and estimates are still unknown. The breeding season of the bat consists of the pregnancy stage, which occurs from May to June, and the lactation stage, which occurs from June to August. Mating occurs from October to November. According to the U.S. Fish and Wildlife Service, females often give birth to twins, as seen in the mainland hoary bat species. Based on one study, the average number of pups per one female that survives to weaning is 1.8.

Historical and present range 
L.semotus occurs on all the major volcanic islands of Hawaii including Kauai, Oahu, Maui, Molokai, and Hawaii, and that breeding populations have been noted in all except for Niihau and Kahoolawe. The timing and origin of dispersal events of the Hawaiian hoary bat have not been studied in much detail. There is fossil evidence of the bats on the islands of Hawaii, Molokai, Maui, Oahu, and Kauai.

According to the 1998 Recovery Plan, the populations were thought to be largest on the islands of Kauaii and Hawaii.

Conservation 
Lasiurus cinereus (with L. semotus listed as a subspecies) is classified as Least Concern by the IUCN. Within the US, the Hawaiian hoary bat was first listed as endangered under the Endangered Species Act (ESA) on October 13, 1970. An "endangered species" is any species or subspecies that is "in danger of extinction throughout all or a significant portion of its range." The exact number of Hawaiian hoary bats was unknown, and the addition of the species to the list seems to have been precautionary.

The United States Fish and Wildlife Service issued a recovery plan for the bat in 1998, with the goal of down-listing the bat from endangered to threatened status, and eventually to de-list it entirely. Threats to the subspecies include deforestation and habitat loss, as well as indirect harm due to pesticide use.

Recovery criteria of the 1998 plan include:

determination of actual population status and habitat requirements
populations on Hawaii, Kauai, and Maui are stable or increasing for at least 5 years.

In 2009, a 5-year-review was initiated for 103 species in Hawaii, including the Hawaiian hoary bat. In 2011, a summary and evaluation of the 5-year review determined that, due to lack of data on population size and trends, the species could not be down-listed nor delisted.

In 2018 another 5-year review was initiated, but no summary or evaluation has been posted.

Threats 
The Hawaiian hoary bat is a generalist distributed on all the major Hawaiian islands. Certain factors affect their population, almost all of which are anthropogenic. Biological factors, such as predation and competition, may affect the species but have not been studied at length at this time.

The largest contributor to bat mortality is collisions with man-made objects such as barbed wire fences, communication towers, and wind turbines. Barbed wire fences are the leading cause of mortality. There are two proposed reasons that bats are attracted to wind turbines. The turbines may look like trees or the blades may resemble the flight pattern of another bat. The state of Hawai’i has declared that by 2030, renewable energy will provide 70% of the state’s energy, and this will likely include an expansion of wind energy. This could increase the threat of wind energy, since more turbines could lead to more bat collisions.

The bats require treetops for roosting and thus habitat loss is a threat. With the clearing of trees for continued development in Hawaii, bats are unable to find places to reproduce. This is mainly caused by clearing for pastures, pineapple fields, and sugar cane farms. While they may use open areas to forage, not having enough pups will impact them. Tree trimming also affects new pups, as they may be unable to take flight.

Insects account for a large part of their foraging diet. Because of this, the increased use of pesticides threatens to decrease insect populations. This is problematic because insects are a major part of the bats’ food supply. However, citric acid used on invasive Eleutherodactylus frog species was found to be unlikely to have a negative effect on the bats. Beyond this, the use of pesticides is not well understood and requires further investigation.

Recordings from 1978 indicated that the bats may have been present on Kahoolawe Island, long devastated by bombing and the target of habitat restoration efforts.

Current conservation efforts 
The largest contributor to the listing of the Hawaiian hoary bat as endangered is a lack of information on the species. Specifically, its range and population are not very well known.

A useful method of estimating the population is monitoring the bats' echolocation calls. Because this is the only known bat in Hawaii, any bat echolocation signals heard and recorded come from this subspecies, and this monitoring method does not interfere with the animal.

Acoustic monitoring is being used for tracking the species and better defining its range. This type of information has been used both in academic and industry-funded research projects. For example, a study was commissioned by Auwahi Wind Energy to maintain their permit. Gathering information will contribute to either down-listing the species or to further efforts to conserve it. Studies have been completed as recently as January 2020 in cooperation with the USGS.

In January 2020, the Hawaiian hoary bat Guidance for Renewable Wind Energy Proponents was updated. This document provides a framework for the development of Habitat Conservation Plans (HCPs). Requirements for approval include minimizing bat death, determining impacts sufficiently, providing benefits to the species, and avoiding other specified impacts. It also states that the mitigation framework should be updated. This should happen, at a minimum, every five years. It also outlines recommendations in the following areas:

Habitat restoration
Land acquisition
Research as mitigation
In-lieu fee approaches

No current action for the Hawaiian hoary bat exists at the federal level. Generally, action is being taken at the state level involving many institutions including the University of Hawai’i.

References

External links 

 Creature Feature: The Hawaiian Hoary Bat (‘ōpe‘ape‘a) is Hawaii’s Only Native Terrestrial Mammal
 Hawaiian Hoary Bat — Our Only Native Land Mammal
 Origins of the Hawaiian Hoary Bat Revealed

Lasiurini
Bats of Oceania
Endemic fauna of Hawaii
Bat, Hawaiian hoary
Endangered fauna of Hawaii
Mammals described in 1890
ESA endangered species
Taxa named by Harrison Allen